The D12E is a diesel locomotive and currently used on Vietnam Railways network.

History 
These were built at Czechoslovakia, then, they give 25 locomotives to Da Nang Locomotive Enterprise and 15 for Hanoi Locomotive Enterprise in 1986. But since 1996, Da Nang Locomotive Enterprise has given 12 D12E locomotives to Hanoi Locomotive Enterprise and Ha Lao Locomotive Enterprise.

Information 
Power type: Diesel

Built: 1986 (Czechoslovakia)

UIC: Bo-Bo

Gauge: 1,000 mm

Length: 13,306 mm

Width: 2,754 mm

Height: 3,854 mm

Loco weight: 56 t

Transmission: Electric DC - DC

Maximum speed: 80 km/h

Power output: 736 KW

References

Diesel locomotive engines
Transport in Vietnam